The radiate sternocostal ligaments are fibrous bands that cross from the sternal end of the costal cartilage to the ventral part of the sternum.

Ligaments of the torso